The Naididae (including the former family Tubificidae) are a family of clitellate oligochaete worms like the sludge worm, Tubifex tubifex. They are key components of the benthic communities of many freshwater and marine ecosystems. In freshwater aquaria they may be referred to as detritus worms.

Description
These worms can vary in size, from centimeters to millimeters, depending on the subfamily. They are all hermaphroditic and lack a larval stage.

Taxonomy
Analysis of 18S rDNA sequences revealed that the tradition family Tubificidae is not monophyletic, with the traditionally circumscribed Naididae nested within tubidicid taxa. To avoid paraphyly the naidid and tubificid taxa were included in a combined family, which took the name Naididae because it has priority under International Code of Zoological Nomenclature rules as the senior synonym of Tubificidae. A proposal to the International Commission on Zoological Nomenclature to suppress Naididae, because the "tubificids" are the more well-known group of the two, was rejected.

The family Naididae is divided into six subfamilies, arranged here in the presumed phylogenetic sequence:
 Tubificinae Eisen, 1879, containing (among others) the genus Tubifex
 Naidinae Ehrenberg, 1828
 Telmatodrilinae Eisen, 1879
 Limnodriloidinae Erséus, 1982
 Phallodrilinae Brinkhurst, 1971
 Pristininae Lastočkin, 1921, often included in Naidinae
 Rhyacodrilinae Hrabě, 1963

Presence in aquariums
In an aquarium, numbers of naididae can increase rapidly. When their population becomes high, the worms migrate toward the surface of the water for access to higher concentrations of oxygen. Although detritus worms may not cause harm to aquarium fish, their appearance is an indication of poor water quality mainly due to overfeeding and lack of good water sanitation.

Improvement of water quality, filtration, gravel cleaning, and the reduction of feeding, may be performed to bring detritus worm population back to normal. Detritus worms feed on excess food and waste, thereby contributing to the ecosystem of an aquarium.

Gallery

References

 
Annelid families
Taxa named by Christian Gottfried Ehrenberg